Pont de l'Alma is a railway station in Paris, France, on Line C of the Île-de-France's suburban rail system, the Réseau Express Régional (RER). First opened in 1900, the station is in the 7th arrondissement of Paris. Alma – Marceau on Paris Métro Line 9 is located on the other side of the Pont de l'Alma. The Musée du quai Branly – Jacques Chirac is located near the station.

This station was closed 25 July 2017 for renovation. Its reopening was delayed for August 2017, then end-2017, then end-2018, then 25 August 2019. It finally reopened on 15 September 2019.

See also
 List of stations of the RER

External links

 

Buildings and structures in the 7th arrondissement of Paris
Railway stations in France opened in 1900
Réseau Express Régional stations
Railway stations in Paris